Epiphaxum is a genus of anthozoans in the family Lithotelestidae.

Species
 Epiphaxum breve Bayer, 1992
 Epiphaxum micropora (Bayer & Muzik, 1977)
 Epiphaxum septifer Bayer, 1992

References

Lithotelestidae